A stuntman or stunt performer is someone who performs dangerous stunts.

Stuntman may also refer to:

Films
The Stunt Man, a 1980 film starring Peter O'Toole
 Stuntman (1994 film), a Bollywood film
 Stuntman (2018 film), an American documentary film
 Stuntmen, a 2009 comedy film starring Marc Blucas

Music
 Stuntman (Edgar Froese album), 1979
 Stuntman ('t Hof van Commerce album), 2012
 The Mad Stuntman (born 1967), Trinidad and Tobago singer

Video games
 Stuntman (video game), a 2002 video game
 Stuntman: Ignition, a 2007 sequel
 Stunt Man, or Nightmare, a 1983 video game for the Atari 2600